Postia amylocystis is a species of poroid fungus in the family Fomitopsidaceae. Found In China, the fungus was described as new to science in 1994 by mycologists Yu-Cheng Dai and Pertti Renvall. The original type collections were made in the Changbai Mountain Range, where the fungus was found growing on a decayed trunk of Manchurian lime (Tilia mandshurica). Characteristics that distinguish P. amylocystis from other Postia species include thick-walled cystidia in the hymenium, and narrow, sausage-shaped (allantoid) spores. The specific epithet amylocystis refers to the amyloid cystidia, and hints at a possible phylogenetic relationship to Amylocystis lapponica.

References

Fungi described in 1994
Fungi of China
Fomitopsidaceae
Taxa named by Yu-Cheng Dai